Charminster may refer to two places in Dorset, England:
 Charminster, a village and civil parish
 Charminster, Bournemouth, a suburb of the town of Bournemouth